The 2014 African Judo Championships were the 35th edition of the African Judo Championships, and were held in Port-Louis, Mauritius from 26 to 29 June 2014.

Medal overview

Men

Women

Medals table

References

External links
 
 Results

A
African Judo Championships
International sports competitions hosted by Mauritius
African Judo Championships, 2014
African Judo Championships